

Season summary
Popular manager Claudio Ranieri returned to Valencia for a second spell in charge after being dismissed by Chelsea. The team started well, winning the UEFA Super Cup and winning 14 points from their first 6 matches, but in October a strong start were cut short by heralded a run of only one win from 7 games and elimination from the Champions League. Form failed to improve in 2005, with a 6-match winless run and early elimination from the UEFA Cup. Ranieri was sacked in late February with the team in 6th. Youth coach Antonio López took charge for the rest of the season, which saw Los Che finish in awful 7th place and thus qualified for UEFA Intertoto Cup for next season. Getafe coach Quique Sánchez Flores was hired as permanent head coach.

Players

First-team squad
Squad at end of season

Left club during season

Competitions

La Liga

League table

UEFA Super Cup

La Liga

Result round by round

UEFA Champions League

Group stage

UEFA Cup

Round of 32

2–2 on aggregate, Steaua București won 4–3 on penalty shootout.

References

Valencia CF seasons
Valencia CF